The Secretary General of the Organisation of Islamic Cooperation, is the chief administrative officer of the Organisation of Islamic Cooperation (OIC) and the head of the General Secretariat and other organs of the OIC. A secretary general is elected by the recommendation of the OIC Council of Foreign Ministers from the 57 member states for a renewable term of five years.

It is the main post within the OIC elected under the maxims of equity and its principals. OIC's secretary general is the second highest intergovernmental organization head after the Secretary-General of the United Nations while the undersecretary general is the second highest position within the framework of the OIC's decision implementation. Any member state is entitled to be eligible for the post with rotation and equal opportunity, integrity and experience.

Powers and duties 
The role of a general secretary is described by the principles of the OIC guidelines. It determines the role of entire organisation within the scope of the OIC guidelines.

A Secretary general brings matters to the attention of the relevant organs of the organisation as per its own opinions within the framework of the organisation. It may serve or adversely affect the objectives of the organization. It implements final decision and resolutions made or recommended by the Council of Foreign or the Ministers and Islamic summits associated with the organisation.

Once a decision is implemented, it provides papers and memorandum to member states for the implementation of decisions, recommendations and resolutions. A secretary general coordinates with the other organs of the OIC for better understanding and collaboration, in addition to exchange important decisions pertaining to the member states. It submit annual report of the OIC concerning organisational activities to the member states.

Tunku Abdul Rahman was the first secretary general of the OIC who assumed the office in 1971 until 1973.

List of secretaries-general

See also 
Secretary-General of the United Nations
Secretary General of NATO
Secretary General of the Organization of American States

References 

Secretaries-general